This is a list of artillery games, sorted chronologically. Information regarding date of release, developer, platform, setting and notability is provided when available. The table can be sorted by clicking on the small boxes next to the column headings.

Legend

List

See also 
 Artillery game

References

Timelines of video games
Artillery
Artillery video games